Sir William de Essendon, de Estdene or Eastdean (died after 1314) was an English-born cleric, lawyer and Crown official, much of whose career was spent in Ireland in the reign of Edward I of England. He served twice as Lord High Treasurer of Ireland, and had a high reputation for integrity and efficiency.

He was a native of East Dean, West Sussex. His name means simply "William of East Dean", and he is referred to frequently in the records as William de Estdene, or occasionally as William of Eastdean.

He was in holy orders, and was presented with the living of Ereford, Winchester in 1282. He enjoyed royal favour from quite early in his career, and in her last years (c.1289-91) Essendon acted as general attorney to the Queen Dowager of England, Eleanor of Provence, and as supervisor of her stewards, with power to investigate their activities on all of her many estates.

He was chosen as Lord Treasurer of Ireland in 1292, and before going to Ireland that summer he had detailed discussions with officials of the English Exchequer about the state of the Irish Treasury. These discussions resulted in an ordinance bringing the practice of the Exchequer of Ireland into line with that at Westminster. Soon after his arrival in Ireland the King granted him the manor of Chapelizod, in south Dublin. He also received a knighthood. His salary was £40 per annum, the standard salary then for senior officials and judges.

In 1293 he was appointed to head a royal commission to inquire into the numerous complaints of maladministration which had been made against the Justiciar of Ireland, William de Vesci, with instructions to report back to the Crown by the following spring. He travelled to England in April 1294 to report his findings in person to the King and Parliament. He also sat on a committee of three to find a suitable replacement as Justiciar, after de Vesci was removed from office: they chose Sir Walter de la Haye, the Chief Escheator of Ireland, who like Essendon had been a member of the commission of inquiry into de Vesci's conduct. (William fitz Roger, Prior of Kilmainham, who frequently acted as an itinerant justice, had been acting Justiciar in the interim). De Vesci was eventually restored to royal favour, but did not regain office as Justiciar; he died in 1297. After 1294 Essendon was mainly occupied as Treasurer with finding funds to finance the King's wars with France and Scotland, and received royal thanks for his efforts. He witnessed a royal charter, not of great importance, in 1299.<Patent Roll 27 Edward I</ref> In January 1300 he with the Justiciar of Ireland and the Lord Chancellor of Ireland was charged with selecting 300 hobelars (light  cavalry)to send to the King at Carlisle by Midsummer Day,  and to purvey sufficient food and wine for them.

He stepped down as Treasurer in 1300, but served a second term in 1304–5. The Exchequer records show that in 1304 Master William de  Wymondham, the Keeper of the Royal Exchanges at London and  Canterbury, sent him a large quantity of silver and a number of stamps for coining money from the silver.

He was still alive in 1314, when William de la Ryvere, who appears from the  Patent  Rolls  of 1310 to have been a senior Crown servant, appointed him his attorney in a lawsuit for debt in the  Court of Exchequer (Ireland) against the Prior of the Holy Trinity, Dublin.

In an age when Irish Crown officials were regularly accused of incompetence, maladministration and corruption, Essendon enjoyed an enviable reputation for efficiency and honesty.

Sources

Haydn, Joseph The Book of Dignities Longman, Green, Brown and Longmans London 1851
Mackay, Ronan "East Dean (de East Dean, Estdene, Estdean), William" Cambridge Dictionary of Irish Biography 2009
Otway-Ruthven, A.J. A History of Medieval Ireland Barnes and Noble reissue New York 1993
The Red Book of the Irish Exchequer Published in "Transactions of the Chronological Institute of London" 1852
Sir James Ware History of Ireland 1745 edition, printed by S. Powell, Dublin

Notes

Lord High Treasurers of Ireland

13th-century births
14th-century deaths
Year of birth unknown
Year of death unknown